Gérard Virol (13 December 1913 – 17 November 1996) was a French racing cyclist. He rode in the 1939 Tour de France.

References

1913 births
1996 deaths
French male cyclists
Place of birth missing